Gustaf Hermann Dalman (9 June 1855 – 19 August 1941) was a German Lutheran theologian and orientalist. He did extensive field work in Palestine before the First World War, collecting inscriptions, poetry, and proverbs. He also collected physical articles illustrative of the life of the indigenous farmers and herders of the country, including rock and plant samples, house and farm tools, small archaeological finds, and ceramics. He pioneered the study of biblical and early post-biblical Aramaic, publishing an authoritative grammar (1894) and dictionary (1901), as well as other works. His collection of 15,000 historic photographs and 5,000 books, including rare 16th century prints, and maps formed the basis of the Gustaf Dalman Institute at the Ernst Moritz Arndt University, Greifswald, which commemorates and continues his work.

Dalman was appointed by Kaiser Wilhelm II as director of the Deutsches Evangelisches Institut für Altertumswissenschaft des heiligen Landes zu Jerusalem (German Evangelical Institute for Ancient Studies of the Holy Land in Jerusalem), where he served from 1902 to 1917. Dalman experienced the outbreak of World War I on a home leave in Germany. Events prevented a return to Jerusalem. From 1917 he was Professor of Old Testament and Palestine Studies in Greifswald , where in 1920 he founded the Institute for Biblical Geography and Antiquity (today: Gustaf Dalman Institute). In 1921 he was acting provost of the Church of the Redeemer in Jerusalem. From 1905 to 1926 he was editor of the journal Palästinajahrbuch des Deutschen Evangelischen Instituts für Altertumswissenschaft des Heiligen Landes zu Jerusalem (Palestine Yearbook of the German Evangelical Institute for Archeology of the Holy Land in Jerusalem).

In his detailed appreciation of Palestine's customs and agricultural practices, Dalman was not limited to biblical illustrations or the recording of Arabic terms but took his examples to the pre-monotheistic past, as did other ethnographers of the time. In the preface to Volume 1, Dalman alerts the reader to this: "Whoever undertakes such a task as a theologian cannot let himself be seduced by concentrating only on those points that at a first and perhaps very superficial glance seem to show biblical connections. How often does a closer look show that the connections point in another direction? It is also not permitted to report in the descriptions only those aspects that contribute to explaining biblical expressions and statements." Throughout his text, he provides examples of how the most ancient customs are preserved by Palestinian and regional farmers, aspects that have either been forgotten or appropriated today to distance these farmers who have been turned into refugees after 1948 from the deepest antiquity.

Dalman drew his wealth of knowledge on Palestinian Arab agriculture and peasant life from his extensive communications with Tawfiq Canaan, enlarging on the same with other academic sources, such as the cosmographical work of Zakariya al-Qazwini, and the botanical works of George Edward Post and Immanuel Löw.  

The theologian and translator Franz Delitzsch, who translated the New Testament into Hebrew, entrusted to Dalman the work of "thoroughly revising" the Hebrew text.

Works
 Grammatik des Jüdisch-Palästinischen Aramäisch. 1894. 2nd edition. Leipzig, 1905
 Aramäische Dialektproben: unter dem Gesichtspunkt neutestamentlicher Studien (mit Wörterverzeichnis) Leipzig, 1896()

 (volume of Palestinian folksong, folk-tunes and dialect poetry, Arabic text with German translation collected by Dalman 1899-1900)

 Jesus-Jeschua. Leipzig, 1922. English trans., Jesus-Jeshua. Studies in the Aramaic Gospels. London, 1929.

 Arbeit und Sitte in Palastina. [Work and Customs in Palestine] 1937. Reprinted 1964. (in 7 volumes)
 (two volumes)

 (being a translation of: Orte und Wege Jesu)

 Aramäisch-Neuhebräisches Handwörterbuch zu Targum, Talmud und Midrasch. 1901. 2nd revised and expanded edition. Frankfurt am Main, 1922
 (reprinted from 1937 edition)

Articles

See also 
Tawfiq Canaan
Lewis Larsson

References

External links
 
 Marcel Serr: Gustaf Dalman's Palestine. Jerusalem 2016.
 Marcel Serr: Understanding the Land of the Bible: Gustaf Dalman and the Emergence of the German Exploration of Palestine. In: Near Eastern Archaeology, Vol. 79, No. 1 (2016), pp. 27–35.
 Universität Greifswald: Gustaf Dalman Collection 
 Dalman's Aramaic Grammar and Reader (article)

1855 births
1941 deaths
German orientalists
German ethnographers
German Lutheran theologians
20th-century German Protestant theologians
Academic staff of the University of Greifswald
Old Testament scholars
Place of birth missing
German male non-fiction writers
Consuls-general of Sweden
Lutheran biblical scholars
German ethnologists
Palestine ethnographers
Palestinologists
German expatriates in Mandatory Palestine
Early photographers in Palestine
Natural history of Palestine (region)